Battle of Tampico may refer to:

 Battle of Tampico (1829), port town seized by 3,000 Spanish troops during attempt to reconquer Mexico
 Tampico Expedition (1835), an expedition to support Federalist opposition to the Centralist government of Mexico
 Battle of Tampico (1839), a siege from May 26 until June 4, 1839 during the Mexican Federalist War
 Battle of Tampico (1863), a victory for the Republicans on January 19 during the French intervention in Mexico (1862–1867)

See also
 Tampico (disambiguation)